Riccardo Gabbiadini (born 11 March 1970) is a Welsh-born English former footballer. He is the brother of former player Marco Gabbiadini, and played his solitary game for Sunderland alongside his brother in the 1988-89 Second Division season.

In January 1994 Gabbiadini signed for Sligo Rovers in the League of Ireland First Division. Under manager Willie McStay, he was a key member of the team that won the 1993–94 League of Ireland First Division title and League of Ireland First Division Shield, before beating four Premier Division sides en route to winning the FAI Cup. His best moment of the campaign was an audacious chipped goal in a crucial away game against Athlone Town near the end of the season. The win enabled Sligo to leapfrog Athlone Town, and they held on to take the title. Scored two goals in eight league appearances for Sligo.

In the Northern section of Masters Football 2011 he represented Sunderland along with brother Marco however he failed to score and Sunderland failed to qualify from the group stages. The Sunderland 'Masters 2011' team also included Sean Musgrave, Martin Gray, Lee Howey, Martin Smith, Marco Gabbiadini, Chris Makin and Brian Atkinson.

Honours 
Sligo Rovers
 FAI Cup
 1993–94 
  League of Ireland First Division
 1993-94
  League of Ireland First Division Shield

References 

1970 births
Living people
Footballers from Newport, Wales
English footballers
English people of Italian descent
Association football forwards
York City F.C. players
Sunderland A.F.C. players
Blackpool F.C. players
Grimsby Town F.C. players
Brighton & Hove Albion F.C. players
Crewe Alexandra F.C. players
Hartlepool United F.C. players
Scarborough F.C. players
Carlisle United F.C. players
Sligo Rovers F.C. players
League of Ireland players
Footballers from North Yorkshire
Footballers from Yorkshire